Zhongchuan is a town of Lanzhou New Area, China. Before 2019 it was part of Yongdeng County. In 2006 it had a population of 31,191, however by 2020, the entirety of Lanzhou New Area had a population of 450,000.

The plain was formed 70 million years ago with the formation of the Himalaya.

Around 200 BC, the plain was still humid, but during the Han dynasty the plain became  very arid. Thanks to irrigation and new farming methods, it became a fertile agricultural area again. The town is known for its apricot orchards.

From 2018, the entirety of the original town and several villages, totaling , were demolished to make way for the expansion of Lanzhou Zhongchuan Airport, and residents were relocated to Lanzhou and Lanzhou New Area.

References 

Township-level divisions of Gansu